Valentina Visconti (ca. 1357 – before September 1393) was Queen consort of Cyprus and titular Queen consort of Jerusalem by marriage to Peter II of Cyprus. She was the daughter of Bernabò Visconti and his wife Beatrice Regina della Scala.

Life
Valentina was born in Milan and was the eleventh of seventeen children of a cruel and ruthless despot, and an implacable enemy of the Catholic Church.

Queen of Cyprus 
In 1363, King Peter I of Cyprus was visiting Milan, Valentina's father Bernabò promised Peter that his daughter would marry Peter's son the future Peter II of Cyprus. The first choice of Peter's marriage would have been to a daughter of John V Palaiologos; this suggestion was rejected for political reasons, since the Latins did not encourage the marriage of Peter to a Greek princess. The justification that was given to the Palaiologos messengers was that the king was busy with the dangers that threatened Cyprus because of the Genoese invasion of the island.

In 1373, Valentina was about to leave to Milan for Cyprus to marry Peter, but the wedding had to be postponed because of fighting between Cyprus and the Genoese.

In September 1377, the marriage was performed by proxy. The bride left Milan the following year.

Peter and Valentina had one daughter who died at the age of two in Nicosia in 1382.

It is known that Valentina did not get along with her mother-in-law Eleanor of Aragon due to her being involved in many issues and scandals.

To prevent more problems between the two Peter had Eleanor sent back to her homeland of Catalonia, which she protested.

Widowhood 
On 13 October 1382, Valentina was widowed. She quarrelled with her mother-in-law, eventually expelling her from court. After her husband died, she attempted to seize the crown of Cyprus for herself.  Her death is reported in a letter from Queen Helvis of Cyprus to the Duke of Milan which arrived 12 September 1393.

References

Cypriot queens consort
14th-century births
1393 deaths
14th-century Cypriot people
Valentina
House of Lusignan
14th-century Italian women
14th-century Italian nobility